This is a list of provincial parks in Manitoba. Manitoba's provincial parks are maintained by Manitoba Conservation and Climate, a department of the Government of Manitoba.

The Provincial Parks Act distinguishes several types of park: Wilderness, Natural, Recreation, and Heritage.

List of provincial parks 

thumb|200px|right|Falcon Lake in Whiteshell Provincial Park

References

External links 
 Parks and Protected Spaces in Manitoba
 

Manitoba
Provincial parks
 
Manitoba